Cryptophyte  may refer to:
 a plant which survives the unfavorable season underground or underwater in the  Raunkiær plant life-form classification
 cryptomonad, or cryptophyte, a single-celled organism of the phylum Cryptophyta or class Cryptophyceae, most of which are photosynthetic
 fossil plants that produced the cryptospores